The Simeulue people (other names include Simalur, Simeuloë, Simulul, Long Bano and Devayan) are an indigenous group of people inhabiting Simeulue Island off the west coast of Sumatra, Indonesia. They are mostly found in Teupah Barat, Simeulue Timur, Simeulue Tengah, Teupah Selatan and Teluk Dalam districts. The Simeulue people speak Simeulue, a Northwest Sumatra–Barrier Islands language closely related to Sikule (which is also spoken in Simeulue island) and Nias (spoken in neighbouring Nias island). The language also has a strong Acehnese and Malay influence.

The Simeulue people became more widely known worldwide after the 2004 Indian Ocean earthquake and tsunami because of their high survival rate. Their survival was credited to their tradition of oral history. A previous tsunami in 1908 had affected the island, and stories told about it served as disaster preparation. Only 7 people of the total population (78,000 at the time) died in the December 26, 2004 tsunami.

References 

Ethnic groups in Indonesia
Ethnic groups in Sumatra
Muslim communities of Indonesia
Indigenous peoples of Southeast Asia